Ahascragh-Fohenagh GAA is a Gaelic Athletic Association club located in the two Parishes of Fohenagh and Ahascragh, in east County Galway, Ireland. As of 2017, the club competes in the Galway Senior Hurling Championship, having gained Senior status for the first time in 2016.

History
The joined club was initially formed at underage level in 1998 with the amalgamation of the neighbouring clubs of Fohenagh & Ahascragh and achieved success at U14, U15, and minor grades. The club joined at adult level in 2002.

Notable players
Cathal Mannion
Pádraic Mannion

Honours
All-Ireland Intermediate Club Hurling Championship (0): Runners-Up 2017
Connacht Intermediate Club Hurling Championship (1): 2016
 Galway Intermediate Hurling Championship (1): 2016
 Galway Junior C Hurling Championship (1): 2010

References

External links
Twitter account

Gaelic games clubs in County Galway
Hurling clubs in County Galway